Saunders and Lawton was an architectural firm consisting of partners George Willis Lawton and Charles Willard Saunders active from 1898 until 1915 in Seattle, Washington. Other architects at the firm included Herman A. Moldenhour, Paul David Richardson, and J. Charles Stanley. Following Saunders' retirement, Moldenhour would take his place as partner in the firm under the name Lawton & Moldenhour, who would have moderate success throughout the 1920s.

Work

Charles Saunders

King County Courthouse #2 (1890–1891), First Hill, Seattle
Cascade School (1893–1894), Cascade, Seattle
Seattle Theatre #1 (1893), Downtown Seattle
 Denny Hall, Arthur Hall and Mary Hall, (1893–1895) University of Washington, Seattle	
The Bon Marché Department Store #2 (1896) Downtown Seattle

Saunders and Lawton

Stewart House (1898), Seattle
Alaska Building (1903–1904) at Pioneer Square in Seattle
Dairy Barn (1909) at the Alaska–Yukon–Pacific Exposition (AYPE) in Seattle
 Forestry Building (1908–1909) at the AYPE, later served as the home of the Washington State Museum until a bark beetle infestation was discovered	
Women's Building (1908–1909) AYPE	
Alhambra Theatre #2 (1909) downtown Seattle
Henry C. Chadwick House in Seattle			
Cottage Project in Seattle		
Crane Company warehouse and office building (1907), Pioneer Square, Seattle
Dunn Tin Storage Warehouse, Seattle
 Dr. R.P. Lincoln Apartment House, Seattle, 		
Lumber Exchange Building (1902–1903) downtown Seattle
Manufacturers Building (1905–1906), Pioneer Square, Seattle
Masonic Lodge (1915), First Hill, Seattle
Mottman Lodge, Seattle		
Norton Building #1 (1904), Seattle
Northern State Hospital, Sedro-Woolley 
Polson Building (1909–1910), Pioneer Square, Seattle
Rainier Club (1904), downtown Seattle
Seattle Buddhist Church #1 (1906–1908), First Hill, Seattle
Beacon Hill Elementary School #2 (1903–1904), Beacon Hill, Seattle
Walla Walla Elementary School (1902), Central District, Seattle
Monroe Correctional Complex, Monroe, Washington
Westland Building, Pioneer Square, Seattle designed for Albert Hambach

Lawton & Moldenhour
One or more buildings in Hawthorne Square, 4800 Fremont Avenue North in Seattle
Liggett Building (1927), 1424 4th Avenue in Seattle

References

Architecture firms based in Washington (state)
Defunct architecture firms of the United States